Altaf Raja (born 15 October 1967) is an Indian Qawwali singer.  In 1997 Altaf gained recognition with his debut album Tum To Thehre Pardesi. His most recent song is Ae Sanam. He used urdu shayari in his Songs.

Early life
Born in Nagpur to professional Qawwals Mr Ibrahim Iqbal and Mrs Rani Rooplata ji, Altaf Raja began musical training at the age of 15

Career
Raja's breakthrough came in 1997 with the album Tum To Thehre Pardesi, which sold 4million units.

Raja has also acted in Bollywood movies such as Shapath (1997), Yamraaj (1998), Mother (1999), and Ghanchakkar (2013).

Albums

Movies as playback singer 
 Vickida No Varghodo (2022) - Gujarati movie
 Tamasha (2015)
 Dil Lagana - Hunterrr (2015)
 Jholu Ram - Ghanchakkar (2013)
 Madholal: Keep Walking (2010)
 Toonpur Ka Superhero (2010)
 Market (2003)
 Tumse Kitna - Company (2002)
 Aaapka Naam kya - Benaam (1999) 
 Mother (1999)
 Pardesi Babu (1998)
 Keemat: They Are Back (1998)
 Hayo Rabba Pyar Ho Gaya - Tirchhi Topiwale (1998)
 Harjai (2007)
 Hum Hain Aise Chore - Yamraaj (1998)
 Peelo Ishq Di Wisky - Mard (1998)
 Karlo Pyar Karlo - Chandaal (1998)
 Ishq Aur Pyar Ka Maza Lijiye - Shapath (1997)

Movies as composer 
 Dukaan: Pila House (2004)
 Market (2003)

References

External links
 

1967 births
Living people
Indian Muslims
20th-century Indian male classical singers
Musicians from Nagpur
21st-century Indian male classical singers
Singers from Maharashtra